Shooting was contested at the 2015 Summer Universiade from July 5 to 10 at the Naju Jeollanamdo Shooting Range in Naju, South Korea.

Medal summary

Medal table

Men's events

Individual

Team

Women's events

Individual

Team

References

External links
2015 Summer Universiade – Shooting

2015 in shooting sports
2015 Summer Universiade events
Shooting at the Summer Universiade